M. M. Abdulla is an Indian politician from Dravida Munnetra Kazhagam who served as Members of Rajya Sabha.

Personal life 
He was born on 30 July 1975 in Pudukkottai, Tamil Nadu. His parents name were K. Mohamed Ismail and M. Nabeesa. He married A. Jannathul Firthose on 14 July 2002 and has two daughters.

References 

Rajya Sabha members from Tamil Nadu
1975 births
Living people